Asperula taurina is a species of flowering plant in the family Rubiaceae. It was first described in 1753 and is endemic to Albania, Austria, Bulgaria, France, Greece, Hungary, Iran, Italy, Crimea, Romania, Switzerland, Georgia, Armenia, Azerbaijan, Turkey, Slovenia, Croatia, Bosnia, Serbia, and Montenegro. It was also introduced to Denmark, Germany, and Great Britain.

References 

taurina
Flora of Albania
Flora of Austria
Flora of Bulgaria
Flora of France
Flora of Greece
Flora of Hungary
Flora of Iran
Flora of Italy
Flora of the Crimean Peninsula
Flora of Romania
Flora of Switzerland
Flora of Georgia (country)
Flora of Armenia
Flora of Azerbaijan
Flora of Turkey
Flora of Slovenia
Flora of Croatia
Flora of Bosnia and Herzegovina
Flora of Serbia
Flora of Montenegro